"Country Comes to Town" is a song written and recorded by American country music artist Toby Keith.  It was released in May 2000 as the third single from his album How Do You Like Me Now?!.  It peaked at number 4 in the United States, and number 3 in Canada.

Content
It is an up-tempo song that's firmly rooted in the Muscle Shoals sound. The song discusses how once the sun goes down, "country comes to town".

Music video
The music video was filmed in Chicago, Illinois, and was directed by Keary Asmussen, and premiered on CMT on May 18, 2000. It features Keith singing at the famous House of Blues.

Chart positions
"Country Comes to Town" debuted at number 60 on the Hot Country Singles & Tracks chart for the week of May 27, 2000. It reached the Top 5 on the Billboard Country Charts in September 2000, peaking at #4.

Year-end charts

References

2000 singles
1999 songs
Toby Keith songs
Songs written by Toby Keith
Song recordings produced by James Stroud
DreamWorks Records singles